Merritt Patterson is a Canadian actress. She had her breakout role in 2013 on the ABC Family Pretty Little Liars spin-off series Ravenswood then went on to play Ophelia Pryce in the hit E! television series The Royals (2014-2015).  Merritt has starred in a number of holiday films for Hallmark Channel and Great American Family. In 2021, Patterson was cast opposite Dave Franco, Daryl Hannah, and Bill Murray in Quibi's TV Mini-series The Now.

Career
Early in her career, Patterson played several recurring roles including her first credit as a recurring guest star on ABC Family series Kyle XY.  She then went on to star opposite Debby Ryan in Disney Channel's Radio Rebel. In 2013, Merritt starred as Olivia Matheson in the ABC Family series, Ravenswood.  

In 2015, she portrayed Ophelia Pryce, on The Royals. The first scripted show for E! opposite Elizabeth Hurley.

In 2016 Patterson was cast in the second season of the Crackle television drama The Art of More, playing Olivia Brukner, the daughter of Dennis Quaid's character.

From 2017 to 2021, Patterson starred in 11 Hallmark Channel and Great American Family movies. In 2018 she starred as Cynthia Applewhite in Universal Pictures feature film Unbroken: Path To Redemption. Merritt was nominated at the Movieguide Awards for Best Supporting Actress and won Best Supporting Actress at CIFF, Canadian International Faith & Family Film Festival. 

In 2021, Patterson was cast opposite Dave Franco, Daryl Hannah, and Bill Murray in Quibi's TV Mini-series The Now. 

In 2022, Patterson starred in Catering Christmas for  Great American Family opposite Daniel Lissing.

Filmography

Film

Television

References

External links
 
 

Living people
21st-century Canadian actresses
Actresses from British Columbia
Canadian child actresses
Canadian film actresses
Canadian people of Scottish descent
Canadian television actresses
1990 births